There are the international rankings of Ghana.

Economy

World Economic Forum  Global Competitiveness Report  not ranked
Heritage Foundation/The Wall Street Journal Index of Economic Freedom
ranked 91 out of 157

Politics

Transparency International: Corruption Perception Index ranked  69 out of 179
Reporters Without Borders  Worldwide Press Freedom Index ranked 31 out of 173

Society
United Nations Development Programme: Human Development Index ranked 135 out of 177
Vision of Humanity: Global Peace Index ranked 40 out of 121
Institute for Economics and Peace:  Global Peace Index ranked 52 out of 144

International rankings
The following are links to international rankings of Ghana.

According to speedtest.net Ghana has the 5th fastest Internet download and upload speeds on the Africa continent and the 94th fastest Internet download and upload speeds in the world out of 184 listed with an average download speed of 5.68 Mbit/s and upload speed of 3.88 Mbit/s.

Other

References

Ghana